

Osbern FitzOsbern (–1103) was a Norman churchman. He was a relative of King Edward the Confessor as well as being a royal chaplain. During Edward's reign he received the church at Bosham, near Chichester. He was present at the consecration of Westminster Abbey at Christmas 1065. He was a steward for King William I of England during his reign, as well as being a friend of the king. The story that he became William's chancellor is based entirely on a charter that modern historians have declared mostly spurious. He became Bishop of Exeter in 1072, and was consecrated at St. Paul's in London on 27 May 1072 by the Archbishop of Canterbury, Lanfranc.

Osbern was present at the church councils held in 1072 and 1075. Osbern was present at the first Christmas court held by King William II of England after his accession. Osbern did not attend the church council held by Anselm, the new Archbishop of Canterbury in 1102, as he was ill. 

He became embroiled in a dispute with the monks of Battle Abbey, who had established a priory in Exeter. The cathedral chapter of Exeter objected to the priory establishing a graveyard or ringing their bells, and both sides appealed to Anselm, who ruled in Battle's favour on the bell issue. The dispute over the graveyard was still ongoing in 1102, when Pope Paschal II wrote to Osbern ordering him to allow the priory to establish a graveyard for their benefactors.

Osbern FitzOsbern died in 1103, having gone blind before his death. Frank Barlow, a medieval historian, described Osbern as "unsociable".

William FitzOsbern, Earl of Hereford was his brother. Their father was Osbern de Crépon, a guardian and seneschal to the young Duke William.

Citations

Sources

External links
 "Entry for Osbern" in George Oliver's Lives of the Bishops of Exeter

1030s births
1103 deaths
11th-century English Roman Catholic bishops
Bishops of Exeter
Devon Domesday Book tenants-in-chief
Norman clerics given benefices in England
12th-century English Roman Catholic bishops
Year of birth uncertain